Oliver Hampel (born 2 March 1985) is a German former professional footballer who played as a midfielder.

Career
Hampel was born in Wolfen. He signed in summer 2010 with TuRU Düsseldorf, playing for them until 2012.

References

External links
 

1985 births
Living people
Association football midfielders
German footballers
Germany under-21 international footballers
Germany youth international footballers
Hamburger SV players
Hamburger SV II players
Hertha BSC players
Hertha BSC II players
Fortuna Düsseldorf players
Fortuna Düsseldorf II players
Sportfreunde Lotte players
3. Liga players